Minuscule 468 (in the Gregory-Aland numbering), Ο30 (in the Soden numbering), is a Greek minuscule manuscript of the New Testament, on paper. Palaeographically it has been assigned to the 13th century. 
Formerly it was labeled by 118a, 138p, and 55r.

Description 

The codex contains the text of the New Testament except Gospels on 200 paper leaves (size ), with only one lacuna (Acts 19:18-22:17). The text is written in one column per page, 28 lines per page (size of text 15.7 by 10 cm).

It has not much  to the Acts and Apocalypse, but a lot to the Pauline epistles.

The order of books: Acts of the Apostles, Catholic epistles, Pauline epistles, and Book of Revelation.

Text 

Kurt Aland did not place the Greek text of the codex in any Category.
It is an important witness to the 13th century Byzantine text.

History 

The manuscript was slightly examined and described by Scholz, Paulin Martin, and C. R. Gregory (1885). Herman C. Hoskier examined and collated its text only in Book of Revelation.

It was added to the list of New Testament manuscripts by Scholz. 
Formerly it was labeled by 118a, 138p, and 55r. In 1908 Gregory gave the number 468 to it. Gregory saw it in 1885.

It is currently housed at the Bibliothèque nationale de France (Gr. 101) in Paris.

See also 

 List of New Testament minuscules
 Biblical manuscript
 Textual criticism

References

Further reading 

 Herman C. Hoskier, Concerning the Text of the Apocalypse (1 vol., London, 1929), pp. 166–169.

External links 
 

Greek New Testament minuscules
13th-century biblical manuscripts
Bibliothèque nationale de France collections